The Chief Minister of Punjab is the head of government of the Pakistani province of Punjab. The chief minister leads the legislative branch of the provincial government, and is elected by the Provincial Assembly. Given that they have the confidence of the assembly, the chief minister's term is for five years and is subject to no term limits. Syed Mohsin Raza Naqvi is the current interim chief minister of Punjab.

The office of Chief Minister is located in Lahore, the capital of the Punjab province and is known as the CM Secretariat.

List of chief ministers of Punjab 

 Muslim League 
 Pakistan Peoples Party 
 Pakistan Muslim League (N)/Islami Jamhoori Ittehad
 Pakistan Muslim League (J)
 Pakistan Muslim League (Q)
 Pakistan Tehreek-e-Insaf
 Caretaker

See also
 Government of Pakistan 
 Prime Minister of Pakistan 
 Government of Punjab 
 Governor of Punjab
 Chief Secretary Punjab 
 Senior Minister of Punjab
 Leader of the Opposition Punjab
Speaker of the Provincial Assembly of Punjab
 List of Chief Ministers in Pakistan
 List of Governors in Pakistan
 Chief Minister of Khyber Pakhtunkhwa
 Chief Minister of Sindh
 Chief Minister of Balochistan
 Chief Minister of Gilgit-Baltistan 
 Prime Minister of Azad Jammu and Kashmir

Notes

References

External links
 Chief Minister's Website
 Government of Punjab, Pakistan
 Punjab Assembly Website

Punjab